Krasava Point (‘Nos Krasava’ \'nos kra-'sa-va\) is the point on the southeast side of the entrance to Finaeus Cove on the northeast coast of Magnier Peninsula, Graham Coast on the Antarctic Peninsula. It is formed by an offshoot of Orbel Peak.

The feature is named after the settlement of Krasava in Western Bulgaria.

Location
British mapping in 1971.

Maps
 British Antarctic Territory.  Scale 1:200000 topographic map. DOS 610 Series, Sheet W 65 64.  Directorate of Overseas Surveys, Tolworth, UK, 1971.
 Antarctic Digital Database (ADD). Scale 1:250000 topographic map of Antarctica. Scientific Committee on Antarctic Research (SCAR), 1993–2016.

References
 Krasava Point. SCAR Composite Antarctic Gazetteer.
 Bulgarian Antarctic Gazetteer. Antarctic Place-names Commission. (details in Bulgarian, basic data in English)

External links
 Krasava Point. Copernix satellite image

Bulgaria and the Antarctic
Headlands of Graham Land
Graham Coast